The 10th Metro Manila Film Festival was held in 1984.

Cherubim Films' Bulaklak sa City Jail won most of the awards including the Best Picture Award, Best Actress for Nora Aunor and Best Director for Mario O'Hara among others. 

A total of nine entries participated in the "filmfest" and saw the debut of Shake, Rattle and Roll, probably the most successful film series in the history of Philippine cinema.

Entries

Winners and nominees

Awards
Winners are listed first and highlighted in boldface.

Multiple awards

References

External links

Metro Manila Film Festival
MMFF
MMFF